Joan Adam (born April 4, 1944) is an American politician, attorney and historic preservation advocate who served five terms as a member of the Kansas House of Representatives as the representative from the 48th district in Atchison, Kansas. A Democrat, she was elected to the House of Representatives in 1982 and served until the end of her fifth term in 1992; in January of 1993, she was succeeded by Jerry Henry.

Representative Adam authored the Kansas Heritage Trust Fund during her tenure in the Kansas Legislature. A resident of Kansas City, Kansas, she is a board member of Historic Kansas City and a former president of Historic Kansas City.

References

Living people
1944 births
Democratic Party members of the Kansas House of Representatives
20th-century American politicians
20th-century American women politicians
Women state legislators in Kansas
Kansas lawyers
People from Atchison, Kansas
People from Kansas City, Kansas
21st-century American women